Powari is an Indo-Aryan language spoken primarily in Madhya Pradesh and  Eastern Maharashtra. It belongs to the Hindi subgroup. However, further classification is difficult to determine. Despite the name, the majority of ethnic Powar people, who amount to approximately one million people (according to estimates in 1986), approximately only about 30%  are native speakers of Powari. However, about 70 % of Powar community members can speak & write Powari language.

Classification 
Powari has variously been classified as a variety of (or possibly a regional name for) the Bundeli language, or as a separate language belonging to either the Eastern Hindi or the Western Hindi subgroups.

Geographical distribution
According to Ethnologue, Powari is spoken in the Balaghat, Seoni, districts of Madhya Pradesh; and Bhandara; and Nagpur; and Gondia districts of Maharashtra.

References 

 
Indo-Aryan languages